Cumberland Basin could refer to:

 Cumberland Basin (Bristol), in Bristol, United Kingdom.
 Cumberland Basin (Canada), in Canada.
 Cumberland Basin (London), in London, United Kingdom.